Uniontown is an unincorporated community in Vernon Township, Jackson County, Indiana.

Uniontown was platted in 1859.

Geography

Uniontown is known for its location on U.S. Route 31 and State Road 250. It also has an exit from Interstate 65.

References

Unincorporated communities in Jackson County, Indiana
Unincorporated communities in Indiana